Samuel Poulin may refer to:
 Sam Poulin (ice hockey)
 Samuel Poulin (politician)